Joe Naufahu (born Joseph Stalin Pereira Naufahu 25 January 1978 in New Zealand) is a New Zealand actor and former professional rugby player. During his rugby career, he played for the Leicester Tigers and Glasgow Warriors, among others, and briefly coached the Glasgow Hutchesons Aloysians. He began acting in 2005. Most notably, he portrayed Khal Moro in the sixth season of the HBO fantasy TV series Game of Thrones. In August 2021, it was announced that he would feature in the 2021 Season of 
Celebrity Treasure Island 2021.

Personal life

Naufahu has stated his grandparents were from Tonga, Samoa, Portugal and Germany, though he's also mentioned having Irish roots. His brother is actor and director Rene Naufahu.

Career

Rugby
Naufahu played rugby for his school, King’s College and played with New Zealand Schoolboys on their tour of the United Kingdom in 1995. He then joined the provincial side Canterbury and played for the New Zealand Under 19s and Under 21s. He also played for Southland

He played in the Super 12 Under 23 tournament for the Canterbury Crusaders in 2001.

He moved to the United Kingdom in 2002 and had a brief spell with Leicester Tigers starting 2 matches and making 3 appearances from the bench. From there, he signed for the Glasgow Warriors in December 2002. He worked with the then Glasgow coach Kiwi Searancke coming through the age grades in New Zealand. He was immediately put in the first team. He marked his Glasgow debut by scoring a try against rivals Edinburgh on Boxing Day 2002 at Hughenden Stadium in a 10-10 draw. He also scored a try in the return fixture in Edinburgh and Glasgow ultimately won the match 45-33. In season 2003-04, Naufahu suffered from a knee injury. In his rehabilitation, he played for amateur side Stirling County.

The knee injury eventually caused Naufahu to quit professional rugby but he continued playing for amateur side Glasgow Hutchesons Aloysians in 2004-05. However, the injury eventually prevented him playing at an amateur level and he moved to become a coach at Glasgow Hutchesons Aloysians.

Acting
After some smaller roles, and one of the lead roles in the 2005 TV series The Market, Naufahu secured a recurring role in the sixth season of the fantasy TV series Game of Thrones in 2016 as Khal Moro.

He played Mils Muliaina in the Rugby Union movie The Kick (2014), a biography of All Black Stephen Donald who kicked New Zealand's winning penalty in the 2011 Rugby World Cup.

Fitness
Nauhafu runs a personal training business called Ludus Magnus.

Filmography

Film

Television

References

External links
ESPN Biography
Glasgow Warriors fansite biography
Tigers biography

1978 births
Living people
Glasgow Warriors players
New Zealand rugby union players
Glasgow Hutchesons Aloysians RFC players
Stirling County RFC players
People educated at Auckland Grammar School
21st-century New Zealand male actors
20th-century New Zealand male actors
New Zealand male film actors
New Zealand male television actors
Actors of Samoan descent
Leicester Tigers players
Expatriate rugby union players in Scotland
New Zealand expatriate sportspeople in Scotland
Rugby union centres